11-cis retinol dehydrogenase is an enzyme that in humans is encoded by the RDH5 gene.

References

Further reading